The Director of the Bureau of Engraving and Printing is the head of the Bureau of Engraving and Printing within the United States Department of the Treasury. The current director is Leonard R. Olijar.

The position has existed since 1862, when the United States Congress authorized the Treasury Department to begin printing paper money. Until the 1890s, the office was commonly known as Chief of the Bureau of Engraving and Printing.  

The Director operates with general directions provided by the United States Secretary of the Treasury.

List of directors of the Bureau of Engraving and Printing

Source

References

External links

Directors of the Bureau of Engraving and Printing

United States Department of the Treasury
1862 establishments in the United States